Rokautskyia exaltata is a species of flowering plant in the family Bromeliaceae, endemic to Brazil (the state of Espírito Santo). It was first described by Harry Edward Luther in 1990 as Cryptanthus exaltatus.

References

exaltata
Flora of Brazil
Plants described in 1990